The 1999 Basildon District Council election took place on 6 May 1999 to elect members of Basildon District Council in Essex, England. One third of the council was up for election and the Labour party stayed in overall control of the council.

After the election, the composition of the council was
Labour 23
Conservative 11
Liberal Democrats 8

Election result
The results saw Labour keep their majority after retaining all the seats they had been defending in Basildon. The Conservatives became the main opposition on the council after gaining seats from the Liberal Democrats in Billericay and Wickford. Overall turnout in the election was 24.3%.

All comparisons in vote share are to the corresponding 1995 election.

Ward results

Billericay East

Billericay West

Burstead

Fryerns Central

Fryerns East

Laindon

Langdon Hills

Lee Chapel

Nethermayne

Pitsea East

Pitsea West

Vange

Wickford North

Wickford South

References

1999
1999 English local elections
1990s in Essex